The Dorofei is a right tributary of the river Vedea in Romania. It discharges into the Vedea in Nicolae Titulescu.

References

Rivers of Romania
Rivers of Olt County